Lukáš Kalvach (born 19 July 1995) is a Czech footballer who plays as a defensive midfielder for Viktoria Plzeň and the Czech Republic national team.

Club career
Kalvach began his career playing at youth level for hometown club Sigma Olomouc. He was assigned to the reserve squad in 2015, making 26 appearances and scoring twice during the 2015–16 Czech National Football League season. He spent the following season on loan at Táborsko, for whom he appeared 25 times. At the beginning of the 2017–18 season, he joined Sigma Olomouc's senior squad and broke into the first team, making a total of 30 appearances in that season and 37 in the next, including in cup and Europa League matches. He scored his first senior goal on 20 September 2017, in an 8–0 cup win against Sokol Živanice. On 2 March 2019, he scored a brace in a 4–0 league win against Dukla Prague.

On 16 May 2019, Kalvach joined Viktoria Plzeň on a three-year deal.

International career
Kalvach has represented Czech Republic at under-19 and under-20 levels. On 2 September 2019, he received his first call-up to the senior side. He made his debut on 14 October 2019 in a friendly against Northern Ireland. He started the game and was substituted at half-time, with his team down 0–3.

References

External links
 Lukáš Kalvach on Viktoria Plzeň's official website
 
 

1995 births
Living people
Sportspeople from Olomouc
Czech footballers
Czech Republic youth international footballers
Czech Republic international footballers
Association football midfielders
Czech First League players
Czech National Football League players
SK Sigma Olomouc players
FC Silon Táborsko players
FC Viktoria Plzeň players